The Lady and the Chauffeur (German: Die Dame und ihr Chauffeur) is a 1928 German silent comedy film directed by Manfred Noa and starring Jack Trevor, Fritz Alberti and Elisabeth Pinajeff. It was shot at the Grunewald Studios and on location in Trieste and Ragusa in the Adriatic. The film's sets were designed by the art directors Hans Sohnle and Otto Erdmann.

Cast
 Jack Trevor as Jan Derrik 
 Fritz Alberti as Mr. Reginald Prittspitt  
 Elisabeth Pinajeff as Bicky, seine Tochter  
 Sig Arno as Arnolescu, der Sekretär  
 Fritz Kampers as George, der Kammerdiener  
 Charlotte Ander as Elli, die Jungfer  
 Angelo Ferrari as Baron Hektor Suedar  
 Yvette Darnys as Yvette, eine Tänzerin  
 Jaro Fürth as Dr. Eck  
 Aribert Wäscher as Thibault, Juwelier  
 Philipp Manning as Lawyer Liemann 
 Hugo Döblin

References

Bibliography
 Bock, Hans-Michael & Bergfelder, Tim. The Concise CineGraph. Encyclopedia of German Cinema. Berghahn Books, 2009.

External links

1928 films
Films of the Weimar Republic
Films directed by Manfred Noa
German silent feature films
German black-and-white films
Films shot in Croatia
German comedy films
1928 comedy films
1920s German films